Hardboiled (or hard-boiled) fiction is a literary genre that shares some of its characters and settings with crime fiction (especially detective fiction and noir fiction). The genre's typical protagonist is a detective who battles the violence of organized crime that flourished during Prohibition (1920–1933) and its aftermath, while dealing with a legal system that has become as corrupt as the organized crime itself. Rendered cynical by this cycle of violence, the detectives of hardboiled fiction are often antiheroes. Notable hardboiled detectives include Dick Tracy, Philip Marlowe, Mike Hammer, Sam Spade, Lew Archer, Slam Bradley, and The Continental Op.

Genre pioneers
The style was pioneered by Carroll John Daly in the mid-1920s, popularized by Dashiell Hammett over the course of the decade, and refined by James M. Cain and by Raymond Chandler beginning in the late 1930s. Its heyday was in 1930s–50s America.

Pulp fiction
From its earliest days, hardboiled fiction was published in and closely associated with so-called pulp magazines. Pulp historian Robert Sampson argues that Gordon Young's "Don Everhard" stories (which appeared in Adventure magazine from 1917 onwards), about an "extremely tough, unsentimental, and lethal" gun-toting urban gambler, anticipated the hardboiled detective stories.  In its earliest uses in the late 1920s, "hardboiled" did not refer to a type of crime fiction; it meant the tough (cynical) attitude towards emotions triggered by violence.

The hardboiled crime story became a staple of several pulp magazines in the 1930s; most famously Black Mask under the editorship of Joseph T. Shaw, but also in other pulps such as Dime Detective and Detective Fiction Weekly. Consequently, "pulp fiction" is often used as a synonym for hardboiled crime fiction or gangster fiction; some would distinguish within it the private-eye story from the crime novel itself. In the United States, the original hardboiled style has been emulated by innumerable writers, including James Ellroy, Paul Cain, Sue Grafton, Chester Himes, Paul Levine, John D. MacDonald, Ross Macdonald, Walter Mosley, Sara Paretsky, Robert B. Parker, and Mickey Spillane.  Later, many hardboiled novels were published by houses specializing in paperback originals, most notably Gold Medal, and in later decades republished by houses such as Black Lizard.

Relation to noir fiction
Hardboiled writing is also associated with "noir fiction". Eddie Duggan discusses the similarities and differences between the two related forms in his 1999 article on pulp writer Cornell Woolrich. In his full-length study of David Goodis, Jay Gertzman notes: "The best definition of hard boiled I know is that of critic Eddie Duggan. In noir, the primary focus is interior: psychic imbalance leading to self-hatred, aggression, sociopathy, or a compulsion to control those with whom one shares experiences. By contrast, hard boiled 'paints a backdrop of institutionalized social corruption.

See also

 Femme fatale
 Noir fiction (Film noir)
 Guy Noir
 Mystery film
 Naturalism (literature)
 Damon Runyon

References

Further reading
 
 
 
 
 
  An essay on the form's early history.
 
 
 

 History of the genre.
 
  A chronology of significant hardboiled novels, compiled by critic Geoffrey O'Brien for the 1981 edition of his Hardboiled America.

External links
 A list of hard-boiled and noir writers.
 Comprehensive bibliographies.
 Comprehensive bibliographies of many important hardboiled/noir authors.

 
Crime fiction
Mystery fiction